Eileen Parsons OBE who served as a member of the House of Assembly of the British Virgin Islands, including as Minister for of Health, Education and Welfare, Deputy Premier and Deputy Speaker during the course of her political career.

Early life and Career
Eileen Parsons was born to Virginia Parrott Fahie and James Elmore Stevens on Tortola in the British Virgin Islands. She attended school on the island, and in Saint Thomas, Barbados, before travelling to Puerto Rico where she went to the Escuela Vocational School to study dressmaking. At the State University of New York at Oswego, she studied industrial arts. Parsons also trained at the Leeward Islands Teachers College and took an associate degree at the University of the Virgin Islands. At the Florida International University, she studied for a bachelor's degree in tourism promotion.

She worked as a teacher in the British Virgin Islands between 1959–65, then for the next thirty years as the secretary to the Commissioner of Education for the Islands, along with the Dean of the University of the Virgin Islands, and the Tourist Board. She sought to move politics, standing for election to the House of Assembly of the British Virgin Islands in 1983, 1986 and 1990. In 1995 she successfully stood as an independent candidate, being elected for the first time. This made her the second woman to enter the House of Assembly. When she became Minister of Health, Education and Welfare in 1997, this was the first time that a woman had been appointed to a ministerial post in the British Virgin Islands. This was followed by an appointment as Deputy Premier two years later. Those posts were revoked in 2000, and she later was named as Deputy Speaker for the House of Assembly.

Parsons was named an OBE in Queen Elizabeth II's 2013 Birthday Honours list for "services to education and the community". By 2014, she was considered a cultural icon on the island. That year she chaired a committee to recognise those who had contributed to the BVI. Her views continued to be sought after she had retired from politics, with her expressing a lack of interest in the prospect of the British Virgin Islands' potential independence from the United Kingdom.

References

Living people
People from Tortola
British Virgin Islands women in politics
Government ministers of the British Virgin Islands
Members of the House of Assembly of the British Virgin Islands
University of the Virgin Islands alumni
Florida International University alumni
National Democratic Party (British Virgin Islands) politicians
State University of New York at Oswego alumni
Members of the Order of the British Empire
20th-century British women politicians
21st-century British women politicians
Year of birth missing (living people)
Women government ministers of the British Virgin Islands